The Vilna Congregation (בית הכנסת אנשי ווילנה) is a synagogue located in the Society Hill section of Center City, Philadelphia. The synagogue is home to an active congregation with Shabbat and holy day services, is affiliated with Lubavitch of Center City, and is the location of a proposed Center City community mikvah. Menachem Schmidt is the rabbi of the synagogue.

History

The Vilna Congregation began in 1904 as a Landsleit shul for Lithuanian Jewish immigrants in Philadelphia. The congregation held services in rented rooms until 1915, when the building on 509 Pine Street was purchased by the Shapiro family. The building was registered as a synagogue on February 1, 1922. Prior to its purchase by the Shapiro family in 1915, the building was the residence of Julius Taussig. The Shapiro family was in the hardware business in the 1920s, at which time the women members organized the Sara Shapiro Sisterhood. The stone above the front doorway reads, "בית הכנסת בני אברהם אבא ב'ר יהודה שאפירא ואנשי ווילנה נוסדה בשנת תרס׳", (translated as The Avraham Aba Bar Shapira and Men of Vilna Synagogue established in the year 5665).

Joseph Hillel Snapir (18841971) served as synagogue rabbi in the 1950s and 1960s. The congregation welcomed the memorial plaques from B'nai Reuben Anshe Sfard when the congregation closed in 1956.

The synagogue held its own daily services until 1974 at which time it decided to hold only Shabbat services.

Current Activity

By the late 1980s, the Vilna Congregation's membership continued to contract and they struggled to gather a minyan by the mid-1980s. 

Menachem Schmidt became rabbi of the shul in 1989, reviving it as a community shul where he led services, hosted meals, and taught. The synagogue conducted services every Friday night for both the Vilna congregation and Congregation B'nai Abraham until 2018. On Shabbos mornings and holy days, the Vilna shul held a “late morning” minyan with a festive kiddish following services in the building's second floor community space.

The building is the proposed site of a Center City mikvah, Mai Shalva. Community members including congregation rabbi Menachem Schmidt organized a group in 2013 called the Center City Community Mikvah, selected a site, commissioned architectural plans and began to raise funds.

References

External links 
Jewish Exponent/Vilna Congregation
Mai Shalva Center City Community Mikvah

Synagogues in Philadelphia
Society Hill, Philadelphia
Ashkenazi synagogues
Ashkenazi Jewish culture in Philadelphia
Lithuanian-American culture in Pennsylvania
Lithuanian-Jewish culture in the United States
Synagogues completed in 1915
1915 establishments in Pennsylvania
Tourist attractions in Philadelphia